Dean Walker (born 18 May 1962) is an English former professional association footballer who played as a central defender. He made one appearance in the Football League.

References

1962 births
Living people
Footballers from Newcastle upon Tyne
English footballers
Association football defenders
Burnley F.C. players
Scunthorpe United F.C. players
English Football League players
Wallsend Boys Club players